Echoing Angels is a Christian rock group from Atlanta, Georgia.

History
The band was initially formed by bassist Josh Armour and drummer Jon Poole under the name Two Bare Feet in 1999. They spent several years working the independent Christian music scene before a single, "You Alone", began to get airplay locally in Atlanta. The group then signed to INO Records, a subsidiary of Columbia Records, and changed their name to Echoing Angels due to copyright issues. Their 2007 debut album, You Alone, peaked at No. 19 on Billboard's Top Heatseekers chart and No. 26 on its Top Christian Albums chart.

Members
Current
 Jon Poole – drums
 Josh LeBlanc – bass
 Trey Heffinger – vocals
 Shannon Cochran – guitar
 Neil Tankersley – keyboard/vocals

Former
 Jared Lee – guitar
 Jeffery Box – keyboard/vocals
 Chris Peevy – vocals (before Feb, 2008)
 Josh Armour – bass

Discography
 Demo EP (Self-released, 2004)
You Alone (INO/Columbia, 2007)
Echoing Angels (eOne, 2011)

References

Christian rock groups from Georgia (U.S. state)
Musical groups from Atlanta
Musical groups established in 1999
1999 establishments in Georgia (U.S. state)